Rayan, also spelled Ryan or Rayaan,  is an Iranian given name of Persian origin. It is primarily a male given name that means "smart", "wise" or "thinker".

Popularity
Because of its similarity to the English given name Ryan, Rayan is popular in the Iranian diaspora, especially among Iranian Americans. As of 2016, the name Rayan ranks 3,315th among the most used names.

Meaning
In Persian, the term rāyān means "wise". It derives from the root rāy, meaning "wisdom", which comes from the Middle Persian term  (/rāy/), from Old Persian (/rāyō/).

See also

Ryan (given name)
Rayen Castle, an adobe castle in Kerman Province, Iran.

References

External links
 List of Iranian Boy Names (نامهای ایرانی پسران) 

Given names
Persian masculine given names
Iranian masculine given names
Iranian-American culture